Poltergeist II: The Other Side (also known simply as Poltergeist II) is a 1986 American supernatural horror film directed by Brian Gibson, and starring JoBeth Williams, Craig T. Nelson, Heather O'Rourke, Oliver Robins, Zelda Rubinstein, Will Sampson, Julian Beck, and Geraldine Fitzgerald. The second entry in the Poltergeist film series and a direct sequel to Poltergeist (1982), it follows the Freeling family who again finds themselves under attack from the supernatural forces led by "the Beast", revealed to be the spirit of an insane preacher who led an apocalyptic cult during the 19th century, attempting to claim their daughter. In their efforts to save their daughter, the family finds help in a Native American shaman.

Filming of Poltergeist II took place in California and Arizona in the spring of 1985. The majority of the original film's cast reprised their respective roles, with the exception of Dominique Dunne, who was murdered shortly after the first film's release in 1982. The film marked the final appearance of Julian Beck, who died on September 14, 1985, as well as the last to be released during Heather O'Rourke's lifetime before her death in February 1988 just four months before her final appearance in the third Poltergeist film, Poltergeist III. Surrealist artist H. R. Giger designed the creatures featured in the film.

Released in the spring of 1986, Poltergeist II: The Other Side was a financial success, earning nearly $75 million worldwide. Critical reviews were negative, but the film nevertheless followed its predecessor with a nomination for the Academy Award for Best Visual Effects, as well as two Saturn Awards.

Plot 
The film is set one year after the events of the first film. The Cuesta Verde neighborhood has been turned into an archaeological dig centered around the spot where the Freelings' home stood. The excavation leads to the discovery of a cave by a ground crew. Its existence is revealed to psychic Tangina Barrons, who informs her friend Taylor, a Native American shaman. After investigating the cave for himself, Taylor realizes that the spirit of Rev. Henry Kane, a deceased, insane preacher, whom he has seen in dreams is after Carol Anne and goes to defend her.

The Freeling family has relocated to Phoenix, Arizona, and now lives in a house with Diane's mother, Jess. Grandma Jess is highly clairvoyant, and believes that Diane and Carol Anne possess the same abilities. Jess later dies from natural causes, but not before telling Diane one last time that she'll always "be there" if she needs her.

Taylor shows up as Kane begins his first assault on the home. Unable to get in through the television as the family has removed all television sets from the home, Kane's minions are forced to find another way in, this time through Carol Anne's toy telephone. The attack fails, and the family gets out of the house quickly. Taylor introduces himself and convinces them that running would be a waste of time since Kane would only find them again, and they return to the house.

Kane shows up at the home one day in human form and demands to be let in, but Steve refuses. Taylor congratulates him for resisting Kane, then takes Steve to the desert and gives him the "Power of Smoke", a Native spirit that can repel Kane. Tangina shows up at the house and helps Diane to understand Kane's history and how he became the Beast that is now stalking the family. She also points out that Diane is unique in that she is one of the only people on earth who have been to the spirit world while living. Diane has visions of Kane in the mid-19th century when he was the head of an apocalyptic cult. Kane led his followers through the desert and into the cave, because he believed that the end of the world was coming, but then kept them trapped and captive there to slowly die with him after the day of his prediction came and went. Because he was so deranged and evil, Kane became a monster after death and controls the souls of his followers. Taylor warns the family that Kane is extremely clever and will try to tear them apart.

With Taylor having left, the family's morale drops. Steve lets his guard down and gets drunk, swallowing a Mezcal worm that is possessed by Kane, who then temporarily possesses him. The possessed Steve tries to rape Diane, who cries out that she loves him, weakening Kane's hold. Steve then vomits up the worm possessed by Kane, which grows into a huge, tentacled horror. In this form, Kane attacks Steve from the ceiling, but Steve uses the smoke spirit to send him away. The Beast launches another assault before the family flees. The Freelings decide to confront the Beast on his own turf, the Other Side.

The Freelings return to Cuesta Verde and, with Tangina, enter the cavern below their former home, where Kane pulls Diane and Carol Anne over into the Other Side. Steve and Robbie jump in after them through a fire started by Taylor. On the Other Side, which appears as a place of floating limbos without the sense of direction, Steve, Diane, Robbie, and Carol Anne unite, but the now monstrously transformed Kane grabs Carol Anne and begins to drain her life force, but she is saved after Taylor gets a charmed Native spear into Steve's hands, and he stabs Kane with it, defeating the monster. Carol Anne nearly crosses over into the afterlife, but Jess' spirit appears and returns her to the family. The Freelings then return safely and thank Taylor and Tangina.

Steve gives the family car to Taylor after he had expressed affection for it previously, and Taylor drives away with Tangina. After the Freelings realize that they now have no ride home, they chase after Taylor.

Cast

Production 

Several scenes that appeared in press stills or promotional posters were cut from the finished film, including one in which Tangina confronts Kane when he tries to enter the house, and another in which Steven and Diane see a flying toaster during a breakfast scene.

Casting 
The majority of the central cast of the original Poltergeist reprised their roles, including Craig T. Nelson and JoBeth Williams as parents Steven and Diane Freeling, as well as Heather O'Rourke and Oliver Robins as Carol Anne and Robbie, respectively. Dana, the eldest daughter of the Freeling family, was intended to appear in a sequence while away at college, but the sequence was scrapped as Dominique Dunne, the actress who portrayed her in the original film, had been murdered in 1982. Zelda Rubinstein also reprised her role as Tangina Barrons, the psychic who assisted the Freelings in the original film. JoBeth Williams commented that she was skeptical of making a sequel, but became convinced upon reading the screenplay. Beatrice Straight was asked to reprise the role of Dr. Lesh from the first film, but she was ill and not willing to work at the time. Richard Lawson was also asked to reprise the role of Ryan, but his schedule clashed with MGM because he was busy filming the TV movie Under the Influence (1986) with Andy Griffith and Keanu Reeves.

Filming 

Principal photography of Poltergeist II began in May 1985 in Los Angeles. The original production schedule spanned 64 days. A private residence in Altadena, California, served as Grandma Jess's Phoenix home, while tract homes in Encino served as a stand-in for the Cuesta Verde neighborhood. The opening desert scenes featuring Will Sampson involving the Hopi obelisk were filmed at the Canyon de Chelly National Monument in Chinle, Arizona.

For interior sequences that required elaborate effects, replicas of the Altadena residence were constructed on Stage 30 of the MGM Studios in Culver City, California. The studio's Stage 27 was used to construct the desert sweat lodge visited by Craig T. Nelson and Will Sampson's characters, as well as the cavern in which the film's finale takes place. Commenting during the shoot, JoBeth Williams said: "It hasn't been as physical as the first film. We don't have as much mud and goo; there is more of the sort of psychological terror, although certainly there will be a lot of effects."

Special effects 
Swiss surrealist artist H. R. Giger was commissioned by Metro-Goldwyn-Mayer to create several designs for the film, specifically the "Great Beast" manifestation of Kane that appears in the astral plane during the film's finale. Because Giger did not want to leave Zurich for long periods of time, his colleague Cornelius De Fries was hired to represent Giger at the studio during production.

Giger was ultimately disappointed with the end result, later attributing the failure to his lack of presence. "When the movies eventually came out I thought, 'Oh shit.' But I couldn't change it," said Giger. "There was no more time. So I thought that was the wrong way to work. If you work on a film you have to be there all the time and be always looking at what they're doing otherwise they'll do what they want." Only two of Giger's designs appear in the final cut of the film, including "The Great Beast" version of Kane.

Post-production 
After actor Julian Beck's death, voice actor Corey Burton was brought in during post-production to loop some of his lines.

Music 
The musical score for Poltergeist II: The Other Side was composed and conducted by composer Jerry Goldsmith, who had written the Academy Award-nominated soundtrack to the first film. Though "Carol Anne's Theme" returns from the first film's soundtrack, the score for The Other Side consists of mostly new material blending traditional orchestral elements with new electronic sounds. The soundtrack album has been released five times: through Intrada Records and Varèse Sarabande in 1986, Intrada in 1993, a deluxe edition by Varèse Sarabande in 2003, a 2-CD set from Kritzerland in 2013, and a 3-CD set from Intrada Records in 2018.

Release

Box office 
Released theatrically on May 23, 1986, Poltergeist II grossed $40,996,665 at the United States and Canadian box office. Internationally it grossed $33.9 million for a worldwide total of $74.9 million.

Critical response 
Nina Darnton of The New York Times wrote that "the movie, like most sequels, has no reason for existing beyond the desire to duplicate a financial success. There are no hanging threads left over from the first tightly woven script that can be pulled out and reworked. Instead, the film seems like a string of special effects held together by a far-fetched storyline with an unsatisfying sticky-sweet ending." Variety stated, "Script has enough humorous breaks and high-wire moments to make up for some of the expository sections in the dialog. While the payoff is a bit weak and less tension-filled than would be expected considering what the Freeling family has just endured, tech credits from beginning to end look like they cost a mint, and filmmakers probably figured they had to stop somewhere." Gene Siskel of the Chicago Tribune gave the film 1 star out of 4 and wrote that director Brian Gibson "simply runs the family through a maze of Indian rituals, ghostly vapors, and astral projections. Lots of sound and fury signifying you know what." Michael Wilmington of the Los Angeles Times stated, "The trappings of 'Poltergeist II' are fairly effective: Jerry Goldsmith contributes another eerie score, and H. R. Giger ('Alien') has dreamed up some loathsome monsters ... But the second film never has the hardness or urgency of the first." Paul Attanasio of The Washington Post wrote, "There are movies that make you want to mince words, and then there's Poltergeist II: The Other Side, a movie so ineffably bad, you can't even find the words to mince."

As of November 2021, the film holds a 20% rating on Rotten Tomatoes based on 54 reviews. The site's consensus reads: "They're back, but this hollow sequel retains none of the charm or suspense that made the original Poltergeist such a haunting specter".

Accolades

Home media 
MGM released Poltergeist II on DVD on August 26, 2003, in a double feature collection along with Poltergeist III. To date there has been no standalone DVD release of the film in Region 1. On September 13, 2011, MGM released the film on Blu-ray.

MGM has also released the film on DVD in Region 2 and Region 4. It was released in the UK on October 23, 2000, and in Australia on September 1, 2006. A double feature pack containing Poltergeist II and III together was released in Region 4 on November 8, 2010.

On January 31, 2017, Scream Factory released a Blu-ray Collector's Edition of the film including new commentaries and featurettes.

Novelization 
The novelization, titled Poltergeist II: The Other Side, was written by James Kahn and published by Ballantine Books in 1986. The cover features an image similar to the film's poster.

The book also better explains many of the unexplained things in the film. The older sister Dana is said to be away at college. There is a better establishment of the psychic powers in Carol Anne, Diane, and the grandmother, which is what attracts Kane.

The absence of Dr. Lesh is explained. Tangina spent time post the first film exploring the plane between worlds and encountered Kane. She reached out to Lesh in her dreams who was drawn in and died. Making Tangina's guilt over her failure double. Thus Tangina reached out to Taylor for assistance. Taylor was a descendant of a former member of Kane's cult that left before they sealed themselves in the cavern. Thus explaining his connection and inside knowledge of Kane.

See also 
 Poltergeist (franchise)
 List of ghost films

References

External links 

  at MGM.com
 
 
 

Poltergeist (franchise)
1986 horror films
1986 films
American supernatural horror films
American sequel films
1980s English-language films
Films scored by Jerry Goldsmith
Films directed by Brian Gibson
Films shot in Arizona
Films shot in California
American ghost films
American haunted house films
Metro-Goldwyn-Mayer films
Films with screenplays by Michael Grais
Films with screenplays by Mark Victor
Films set in Phoenix, Arizona
1980s American films